Marko Šorin (born 9 June 1974 in Sindi) is an Estonian politician. He is a member of XIV Riigikogu.

From 2011 until 2016, he was Mayor of Sindi and former deputy mayor of Pärnu.

Since 2011, he is a member of Estonian Centre Party.

References

1974 births
Estonian Centre Party politicians
Living people
Mayors of places in Estonia
Members of the Riigikogu, 2015–2019
Members of the Riigikogu, 2019–2023
People from Sindi, Estonia